Sloppy may refer to:

 Sloppy Thurston (1899–1973), American baseball player
 Sloppy Smurf, a Smurfs character
 Sloppy, sister of Slimey the Worm, a pet of Oscar the Grouch in the children's television series Sesame Street
 Sloppy, title character in the 2012 film Sloppy the Psychotic

See also
 
 
 Dirty (disambiguation)
 Filth (disambiguation)
 Messy (disambiguation)
 Slop (disambiguation)